Phoenicophanta is a genus of moths of the family Noctuidae. The genus was erected by George Hampson in 1910.

Species
 Phoenicophanta bicolor Barnes & McDunnough, 1916
 Phoenicophanta flavifera Hampson, 1910
 Phoenicophanta modestula Dyar, 1924

References

Acontiinae